Phyllis Coates (born Gypsie Ann Evarts Stell; January 15, 1927)  is an American former actress, with a career spanning over fifty years. She is best known for her portrayal of reporter Lois Lane in the 1951 film Superman and the Mole Men and in the first season of the television series Adventures of Superman.

Early life
Born on January 15, 1927, in Wichita Falls, Texas, Coates is the daughter of Mr. and Mrs. Jack Stell. After graduating from Odessa High School, she moved to Los Angeles with her mother. Coates attended (as Gypsy Stell) Los Angeles City College.

Career

Stage
Originally billed under her birth name as Gypsy Stell, Coates was discovered by vaudeville comedian Ken Murray in a Hollywood and Vine restaurant from whom she learned comic timing.  She subsequently appeared as a dancer and a comedienne in skits for ten months in Blackouts, his "racy" (mildly risqué) variety show. She later performed as one of Earl Carroll's showgirls at his Earl Carroll Theatre. In 1946, she toured with a USO production of Anything Goes.

Film
On July 13, 1944, aged 17, she "began her work with 20th Century Fox ... after receiving a seven year contract with option."

Coates signed a movie contract with Warner Brothers extending from 1948 to 1956, and she co-starred with George O'Hanlon as the title character's wife in the studio's Joe McDoakes short-subject comedies. She acted in film serials, including Jungle Drums of Africa (1953), Gunfighters of the Northwest (1953), and Panther Girl of the Kongo (1955). Her film career also included roles in Girls in Prison (1956), I Was a Teenage Frankenstein (1957), Blood Arrow (1958), Cattle Empire (1958), The Incredible Petrified World (1959), The Baby Maker (1970) and Goodnight, Sweet Marilyn (1989).

Television
In 1952, she guest-starred in "How Death Valley Got Its Name", the first episode of the anthology series Death Valley Days. She appeared in the 1954 Death Valley Days episode "The Light On The Mountain". She was  cast as the widowed Mary in the 1959 episode, "One in a Hundred." In a 1964 episode, "The Left Hand Is Damned," she portrayed the kind-hearted saloon singer Dora Hand of Dodge City, Kansas.

She was cast in The Lone Ranger  in 1953, and in 1955 in "The Woman in the White Mask".  Coates was cast in 1955 as Madge in the CBS sitcom Professional Father. In 1955, she portrayed Medora De More in the two-part episode "King of the Dakotas" of the NBC western anthology series Frontier. In 1956, she was cast in the episode "God in the Street" of another anthology series, Crossroads, based on the lives of American clergymen. That same year, she appeared in a second religious drama, This Is the Life, as Betty in the episode "I Killed Lieutenant Hartwell." She was also cast in 1956 as Marge in the episode "Web Feet" of the military drama Navy Log. She guest-starred in David Janssen's crime drama Richard Diamond, Private Detective.

In 1958, Coates played the mother, Clarissa Holliday, in all thirty-nine episodes of the 1958–1959 situation comedy, This Is Alice. She made guest appearances in three episodes of Perry Mason: murderer Norma Carter in "The Case of the Black-Eyed Blonde" in 1958, "The Case of the Cowardly Lion" in 1961, and in "The Case of the Ice-Cold Hands" in 1964.  In 1961, she was cast as Elizabeth Gwynn in the episode "The Little Fishes" on CBS's Rawhide. Coates guest-starred as well on three episodes of Gunsmoke between 1958 and 1964.

Lois Lane
 
Coates played Lois Lane in the first season of Adventures of Superman. Noel Neill, who had played Lois Lane in two Columbia Superman serials, in 1948 and 1950, replaced Coates, who was not available for the second season. With the death of Noel Neill on July 3, 2016, Coates became the last surviving regular cast member from the Adventures of Superman TV series.

Coates's Superman fame has obscured the fact that she was one of Hollywood's most consistently employed actresses of the 1950s and 1960s. She freelanced steadily, appearing in numerous low-budget features, many of them westerns, as well as serials and a steady stream of TV appearances, both as a regular in several series and as a guest cast member in others. All this was in addition to the "McDoakes" shorts, in which she continued to appear until Warner Brothers discontinued the series in 1956. Arguably, her best-remembered films of the 1950s—perhaps owing to their being those in which she has a substantial role, and being among the few that have been preserved so that they are available today on home video—are Blues Busters with The Bowery Boys (in which she has a musical number); Panther Girl of the Kongo, a jungle serial in which she starred; and I Was a Teenage Frankenstein.

Later years
In the 1960s, when it became clear that Adventures of Superman would continue to enjoy great popularity in syndicated reruns, far beyond the end of its production in 1957, Coates—like many of the other supporting cast members such as Jack Larson ("Jimmy Olsen")—tried to distance herself from the Superman series, fearing it might limit her opportunities. By the mid 1960s, however, she had settled into a comfortable semi-retirement as a wife and homemaker after marrying Los Angeles family physician Howard Press in 1962. She resumed her career after their divorce in 1986, but in the period immediately before that divorce, her film and television appearances were infrequent. One notable role was that of the mother of the female lead in the 1970 film The Baby Maker, directed by James Bridges, the lover and production partner of Jack Larson, who had remained Coates's good friend since they worked together on Adventures of Superman.

Despite her stated misgivings about being remembered only as Lois Lane after relaunching her career,  Coates agreed to appear as Lois's mother in the first season finale of the 1990s television series Lois & Clark: The New Adventures of Superman. Noel Neill, who also played Lois Lane in film and TV series, had already been Lois's mother in the 1978 film Superman. Since then, it has become a tradition in Superman adaptations for actresses who have previously played Lois Lane to later play Lois's mother. Teri Hatcher, who played Lois in Lois & Clark: The New Adventures of Superman, made an appearance in the tenth season of the series Smallville as Lois's mother, Ellen Lane.

Personal life
Coates married director Richard L. Bare in 1948. They divorced in January 1949. She married jazz pianist Robert Nelms in 1950, gave birth to a daughter, and divorced in 1953. Coates married director Norman Tokar in 1955 and gave birth to a son in 1957. She was married to Dr. Howard Press from 1962 to 1986, during which time she gave birth to another daughter.

Filmography and TV work

So You Want to Be in Politics (1948, Short) as Alice McDoakes (uncredited)
Smart Girls Don't Talk (1948) as Cigarette Girl (uncredited)
So You Want to Be on the Radio (1948, Short) as Mrs. Alice McDoakes / Radio Voice (uncredited)
So You Want to Be a Baby Sitter (1949, Short) as Alice McDoakes (uncredited)
Your Show Time (1949, TV Series) 
So You Want to Be Popular (1949, Short) as Office Secretary (uncredited)
A Kiss in the Dark (1949) as Mrs. Hale (uncredited)
Look for the Silver Lining (1949) as Rosie (uncredited)
So You Want to Be a Muscle Man (1949, Short) as Alice McDoakes (uncredited)
So You're Having In-Law Trouble (1949, Short) as Alice McDoakes (uncredited)
The House Across the Street (1949) as Gorgeous (uncredited)
So You Want to Get Rich Quick (1949, Short) as Alice McDoakes (uncredited)
My Foolish Heart (1949) as College Girl on Phone (uncredited)
So You Want to Throw a Party (1950, Short) as Alice McDoakes (uncredited)
So You Think You're Not Guilty (1950, Short) as Alice McDoakes (uncredited)
So You Want to Hold Your Husband (1950, Short) as Alice McDoakes / Baby McDoakes (uncredited)
So You Want to Move (1950, Short) as Alice McDoakes (uncredited)
My Blue Heaven (1950) as Party Girl (uncredited)
So You Want a Raise (1950, Short) as Alice McDoakes (uncredited)
Blues Busters (1950) as Sally Dolan
Outlaws of Texas (1950) as Anne Moore
The Cisco Kid (1950–1951, TV Series) as Marge Lacey / Miss Lacey / JoAnn Doran
Valentino (1951) as Universal Studios Casting Clerk (uncredited)
Man from Sonora (1951) as Cinthy Allison
Canyon Raiders (1951) as Alice Long
So You Want to Be a Cowboy (1951, Short) as Alice McDoakes / Cindy Lou (uncredited)
Stars Over Hollywood (1951, TV Series)
Nevada Badmen (1951) as Carol Bannon
So You Want to Be a Paper Hanger (1951, Short) as Alice McDoakes (uncredited)
So You Want to Buy a Used Car (1951, Short) as Alice McDoakes (uncredited)
Oklahoma Justice (1951) as Goldie Vaughn
So You Want to Be a Bachelor (1951, Short) as Alice Peckinpah McDoakes (uncredited)
So You Want to Be a Plumber (1951, Short) as Alice McDoakes (uncredited)
Superman and the Mole Men (1951) as Lois Lane
The Longhorn (1951) as Gail
Stage to Blue River (1951) as Joyce Westbrook
The Sun Was Setting (1951, TV Short) as Rene
So You Want to Get It Wholesale (1952, Short) as Alice McDoakes (uncredited)
The Gunman (1952) as Anita Forester
Racket Squad (1952, TV Series)
So You Want to Go to a Convention (1952, Short) as Alice McDoakes (uncredited)
So You Never Tell a Lie (1952, Short) as Alice McDoakes (uncredited)
Fargo (1952) as Kathy MacKenzie
Canyon Ambush (1952) as Marian Gaylord
Eagles of the Fleet (1952) as Dorothy Collier
So You Want to Wear the Pants (1952, Short) as Alice McDoakes (uncredited)
Wyoming Roundup (1952) as Terry Howard
Invasion, U.S.A. (1952) as Mrs. Mulfory
The Maverick (1952) as Della Watson
Schlitz Playhouse (1952, TV Series)
The Range Rider (1952, TV Series) as Doris Burton / Jane Tracy
The Files of Jeffrey Jones (1952, TV Series)
Scorching Fury (1952) as Mrs. Penn, woman on sidewalk
Craig Kennedy, Criminologist (1952, TV Series) as Natalie Larkin
Adventures of Superman (1952–1953, TV Series) as Lois Lane
Death Valley Days (1952–1964, TV Series) as Dora Hand / Edna Wiley / Lois Bouquette / Mary / Annie Stewart / Margie McMahon / Virginia Arcane
Jungle Drums of Africa (1953, Serial) as Carol Bryant
Marshal of Cedar Rock (1953) as Martha Clark
She's Back on Broadway (1953) as Blonde (uncredited)
Perils of the Jungle (1953) as Jo Carter
Ramar of the Jungle (1953,TV Series) as Donna Sharp
So You Want a Television Set (1953, Short) as Alice McDoakes (uncredited)
Summer Theatre (1953, TV Series) as Marge Minter
I'm the Law (1953, TV Series)
So You Love Your Dog (1953, Short) as Alice McDoakes (uncredited)
Topeka (1953) as Marian Harrison
Here Come the Girls (1953) as Chorus Girl (uncredited)
El Paso Stampede (1953) as Alice Clark
The Red Skelton Hour (1953, TV Series) as Supporting Sketch Player
So You Think You Can't Sleep (1953, Short) as Alice McDoakes (uncredited)
Your Jeweler's Showcase (1953, TV Series) as Betty Tucker
The Abbott and Costello Show (1953, TV Series) as Millie Montrose
So You Want to Be an Heir (1953, Short) as Alice McDoakes (uncredited)
Terry and the Pirates (1953, TV Series) as Georgia Pettigrew
The Lone Ranger (1953–1955, TV Series) as Jane Johnson / Naomi Courtwright / Ann Wyman
Crown Theatre with Gloria Swanson (1954, TV Series)
So You're Having Neighbor Trouble (1954, Short) as Alice McDoakes (uncredited)
Gunfighters of the Northwest (1954) as Rita Carville
The Adventures of Kit Carson (1954, TV Series) as Jane Sanders
The Duke (1954, TV Series) as Gloria
Public Defender (1954, TV Series) as Amberlee Tolliver
It's a Great Life (1954–1956, TV Series) as Lola Denton / Ann
General Electric Theater (1954–1958, TV Series) as Heather
Panther Girl of the Kongo (1955) as Jean Evans
Professional Father (1955, TV Series) as Nurse Madge Allen
Topper (1955, TV Series) as Queen
Cavalcade of America (1955, TV Series) as Barbara Leland
The Millionaire (1955, TV Series) as Alice Sands
Willy (1955, TV Series) as Betty Estrada
Stage 7 (1955, TV Series) as Alice / Kay Murray
Science Fiction Theatre (1955, TV Series) as Karen Sheldon
Lassie (1955, TV Series) as Miss Vernon
The Great Gildersleeve (1955, TV Series) as Sally Fuller
Frontier (1955, TV Series) as Medora De More
Western Union (1955, TV pilot) as Nancy Carnes 
TV Reader's Digest (1955–1956, TV Series) as Nancy / Mother
Navy Log (1956, TV Series) as Marge
Four Star Theatre (1956, TV Series) as Marsha
So You Want to Be Pretty (1956, Short) as Alice McDoakes aka Cynthia (uncredited)
Chevron Hall of Stars (1956, TV Series) as Mary
So You Want to Play the Piano (1956, Short) as Alice McDoakes (uncredited)
Crossroads (1956, TV Series)
So Your Wife Wants to Work (1956, Short) as Alice McDoakes (uncredited)
Girls in Prison (1956) as Dorothy
Walt Disney's Wonderful World of Color (1956, TV Series) as Mrs. Martin
God Is in the Streets (1956, Short)
This Is the Life (1956, TV Series)
Chicago Confidential (1957) as Helen Fremont (uncredited)
Leave It to Beaver (1957, TV Series) as Betty Donaldson
I Was a Teenage Frankenstein (1957) as Margaret
The Sheriff of Cochise (1958, TV Series) as Vera Watson
Blood Arrow (1958) as Bess Johnson
Richard Diamond, Private Detective (1958, TV Series) as Monica Freeborn
Cattle Empire (1958) as Janice Hamilton
This Is Alice (1958, TV Series) as Clarissa Holliday
Tales of Wells Fargo (1958–1961, TV Series)
Gunsmoke (1958–1964, TV Series) as Edna / Rose Kinney / Hattie Kelly
Perry Mason (1958–1964, TV Series) as Inez Fremont / Frieda Crawson / Norma Carter
Westinghouse Desilu Playhouse (1959, TV Series) as Belle
Black Saddle (1959, TV Series) as Maggie
Lux Playhouse (1959, TV Series) as Ellen Packer
The Incredible Petrified World (1959) as Dale Marshall
Hennesey (1959, TV Series) as Dr. Patricia Granger
Rawhide (1959–1961, TV Series) as Elizabeth Gwynn / Nora Sage
The Untouchables (1959–1962, TV Series) as Angela Lamberto / Ellie Morley / Renee Sullivan
The DuPont Show with June Allyson (1960, TV Series) as Penny
Hawaiian Eye (1960, TV Series) as Laura Seldon
The Best of the Post (1960, TV Series) as Mollie
Gunslinger (1961, TV Series) as Teresa Perez
The Patty Duke Show (1963–1964, TV Series) as Secretary
The Virginian (1964, TV Series) as Mrs. Marden
Gunsmoke (1964, TV Series) as Edna
Slattery's People (1964, TV Series) as Helen Mayfield
Thompson's Ghost (1966, TV Movie) as Milly Thompson
Summer Fun (1966, TV Series) as Milly Thompson
The Baby Maker (1970) as Tish's Mother
Whisper Kill (1988, TV Movie)
Kiss Shot (1989, TV Movie)
Goodnight, Sweet Marilyn (1989) as Gladys Pearl Baker
Midnight Caller (1991, TV Series) as Meredith Gaynor
Mrs. Lambert Remembers Love (1991, TV Movie) as Katherine
Lois & Clark: The New Adventures of Superman (1994, TV Series) as Ellen Lane
Dr. Quinn, Medicine Woman (1994, TV Series) as Mrs. Howard
Hollywood: The Movie (1996, Video) as Old Dora (final appearance)

References

External links

 

1927 births
Living people
20th Century Studios contract players
20th-century American actresses
Actresses from Texas
American film actresses
American television actresses
Film serial actresses
Los Angeles City College alumni
People from Wichita Falls, Texas
Warner Bros. contract players
Western (genre) film actresses